Frazier Kamwandi (born 10 March 1972) is a Zambian footballer. He played in eight matches for the Zambia national football team from 1997 to 1999. He was also named in Zambia's squad for the 1998 African Cup of Nations tournament.

References

External links
 

1972 births
Living people
Zambian footballers
Zambia international footballers
1998 African Cup of Nations players
Place of birth missing (living people)
Association footballers not categorized by position